Les Corps Glorieux is a large organ cycle composed in the summer of 1939 in Saint-Théoffrey (Isère) by Olivier Messiaen. The work was completed on 25 August 1939, a week before the declaration of the Second World War and was premiered by Messiaen himself on 15 April 1945 at the Palais de Chaillot. This work marks an evolution in the musical language of Olivier Messiaen, combining features of both Indian classical music and Gregorian chant. The work, together with L'Ascension (1934) and La Nativité du Seigneur (1935), is one of the three early organ cycles of the composer.

Structure
Les Corps Glorieux is divided into seven movements:

1. Subtilité des Corps Glorieux
This movement is a single unharmonised melody based on a Gregorian antiphon. Each end of a phrase is repeated as an echo. Cornet registrations alternate between the Grand-Orgue, Positif and Récit manuals. The unchanging monophony of this movement, the simplest and purest musical form, symbolises the "subtilité".

The subtitle of this movement, added by the composer, reads translated: "An earthly body is being sown, a spiritual body is raised." (1 Corinthians 15:44) "And they shall be as the angels of God in heaven." (Matthew 22:30)

2. Les eaux de la Grâce
The "Waters of grace" are symbolised here by a 4' ostinato in the pedal, which is simultaneously played in diminution by the left hand, while in the right hand a harmonized melody is heard. The octave doubling of this melody by the 16' register gives an unusual effect. After 29 bars, the movement breaks without a real conclusion - the melody could be carried on to infinity.

The subtitle of this sentence reads: "The Lamb in the midst of the throne will lead the chosen to the waters of life." (Revelation John 7:17)

3. L'ange aux parfums
The texture in this movement is wide-ranging, from simple monophony to complicated counterpoint . At the beginning of the second part of the movement, a unison melody acts as a cantus firmus . In a following, fast section, the ascent of the incense is symbolised through fast semiquaver runs. These runs abruptly cut short to end the movement.

The subtitle of this movement reads: "The fragrance of incense rose up to God with the prayers of the saints from the hand of the angel." (Revelation 8: 4)

4. Combat de Mort et de la Vie
This is the longest set of the cycle. Death initially embodies an aggressive toccata over a powerful low motif, after which life is represented by a quiet, meditative second half.

The subtitle used by the composer in this movement reads: "Death and life fought a strange struggle. Though dead, the prince of life is victorious and reigns. He saith, My father, I am risen, and I am with thee." (from the Sequence and Introitus of the Easter festival)

5. Force et agilité des Corps Glorieux
In this movement the main motif consists of a brief glissando followed by a staccato quaver chain on a single note,in octaves.

The subtitle of this movement reads: "A weak body is sown, a powerful body is raised" (1 Corinthians 15:43)

6. Joie et clarté des Corps Glorieux
A unison, rhapsodic theme in the upper voice, interrupted by three chords played in the récit, is heard at the beginning of the movement over a receding fifth in the pedal. This is followed by a quieter middle section, in which the cromorne of the Positif and the Hautbois of the Récite correspond. The main and middle sections alternate with each other, followed by the coda, which shows the main part rhythmically slightly changed. The so-called "Freudenmotiv" then breaks off spectacularly and the movement ends with a virtuosic glissando.

The subtitle of this movement reads: "Then the righteous will shine like the sun in the kingdom of their father." (Matthew 13:43)

7. Le Mystère de la Sainte-Trinité
In contrast to Messiaen's " La Nativité du Seigneur " organ cycle, "Les Corps Glorieux" has a calm and meditative ending. The holy Trinity is symbolised by the three-part counterpoint of the movement. Contrasting stop registrations (32 'in the pedal against 16' and 2 'in the Récit) dominate this movement, which may be regarded as a precursor (not in style but in subject) to the organ-cycle Méditations sur le Mystère de la Sainte Trinité.

The subtitle of this movement reads: "Almighty Father. With your only Son and Holy Spirit, you are a God. Not in the uniqueness of a person, but in the Trinity of a Being. "(from the Preface to the Sunday Trinitatis)

References 

Compositions by Olivier Messiaen